The Military Medal is the highest military decoration of Luxembourg.  Established on 30 October 1945 by Charlotte, Grand Duchess of Luxembourg, at the suggestion of then Prince Jean, it can be awarded for outstanding achievements and extraordinary deeds to all military personnel, without distinction of rank.

Appearance
The medal is a bronze circular disc.  The obverse depicts the left facing profile of Grand Duchess Charlotte.  Around the edge is the inscription Charlotte Grand Duchess of Luxembourg (Charlotte Grande-Duchesse de Luxembourg).  The reverse depicts the Lesser coat of arms of Luxembourg.  To the left of the arms is 19 and to the right 40.

Recipients
 General of the Army Dwight D. Eisenhower, 3 August 1945
 Prince regent Charles of Belgium, 1 December 1945
 Prime Minister Winston Churchill, 14 July 1946
 Field Marshal Bernard Montgomery, 17 November 1948
 General Charles de Gaulle, 1 October 1963
 Major General Patrick F. Cassidy, 8 July 1967
 The Unknown Soldier of the United States for World War II, 22 October 1984
 Jean, Grand Duke of Luxembourg, 17 December 2002
Corporal Richard Brookins, 2016

References

Military awards and decorations of Luxembourg
Awards established in 1945
1945 establishments in Luxembourg